On October 31, 2013, a waste pit at the Obed Mountain Mine failed near the town of Hinton in Alberta, Canada. The river's waters experienced immediate spikes in arsenic, metals, and carcinogenic polycyclic aromatic hydrocarbons (PAHs). Although the Athabasca was deemed safe for drinking and wildlife by the end of the year, the extent of the environment's recovery remained in doubt.

Spill 
Tailings ponds were constructed to contain water used to wash coal; besides wastewater, the pools also contained fine rock and clay particles, unrecovered coal, and flocculents.

On October31, 2013, one of the mine's tailings dams failed, and between 600 million and one billion litres of slurry poured into the Plante and Apetowun Creeks.

Environmental impact 
In the first month after the spill, water quality tests revealed the presence of metals and chemicals such as cadmium, arsenic, manganese, lead, mercury, and polycyclic aromatic hydrocarbons (PAHs) in excess of limits for consumption or life along the first  of the Athabasca River. Mercury, for instance, was found to be nine times higher than normal, while PAHs were at levels four times higher than the Canadian standard for potable water. As a result, residents were discouraged from drinking any of the Athabasca as well as watering any livestock or pets. 

By December 2013, as the plume reached Fort McMurray, government officials reported that water from the Athabasca was once again below safety thresholds for both wildlife and drinking water. Monitoring continued for at least two years, although First Nations representatives disputed the rigour of the sampling program, its exclusion of data from sediment, and the lack of information made available to the public.

Aftermath 
In October 2015, the Alberta Energy Regulator corporation filed charges against the mine's operators, Sheritt Coal and Coal Valley Resources Inc., on several counts of violations of the Environmental Protection and Enhancement Act, the Water Act, and the Public Lands Act which could have amounted up to a $2.2 million fine. Proceedings began on January20, 2016.

In June 2017, Prairie Mines & Royalty, formerly known as Coal Valley Resources, a subsidiary of Sheritt Coal, was fined $4.5 million after the company pled guilty to two violations of federal law under the Fisheries Act and one violation of Alberta's Environmental Protection and Enhancement Act.

References 

2013 mining disasters
2013 industrial disasters
2013 disasters in Canada
2013 in the environment
2013 in Alberta
Oil spills in Alberta
Coal mines in Canada
Coal mining disasters in Canada
Construction accidents
Environmental disasters in Canada
Hinton, Alberta
Mines in Alberta
Tailings dam failures
Waste disposal incidents
Water and politics
Environmental issues in Alberta
Dam failures in North America